Sandra Cecchini and Laura Garrone were the defending champions but only Garrone competed that year with Alexandra Fusai.

Fusai and Garrone lost in the final 1–6, 6–4, 7–5 against Olga Lugina and Elena Pampoulova.

Seeds
Champion seeds are indicated in bold text while text in italics indicates the round in which those seeds were eliminated.

 Alexandra Fusai /  Laura Garrone (final)
 Olga Lugina /  Elena Pampoulova (champions)
 Magdalena Grzybowska /  Aleksandra Olsza (semifinals)
 Radka Bobková /  Eva Melicharová (semifinals)

Draw

External links
 1996 Warsaw Cup by Heros Doubles Draw

Warsaw Open
1996 WTA Tour